Aq Qaleh (also Romanized as Āq Qal‘eh) is a village in Bam Rural District, Bam and Safiabad District, Esfarayen County, North Khorasan Province, Iran. At the 2006 census, its population was 446, in 117 families.

References 

Populated places in Esfarayen County